The 2010 FIA WTCC Race of UK (formally the 2010 FIA WTCC Marriott Race of UK) was the sixth round of the 2010 World Touring Car Championship season and the sixth running of the FIA WTCC Race of UK. It was held at Brands Hatch in Kent, England on 18 July 2010. The two races were won by Yvan Muller of Chevrolet RML and Andy Priaulx of BMW Team RBM.

Background
After the Race of Portugal, Chevrolet driver Muller was leading the drivers' championship while Sergio Hernández was leading the Yokohama Independents' Trophy.

Chevrolet RML ran an additional Chevrolet Cruze for triple Stock Car Brasil champion Cacá Bueno. Liqui Moly Team Engstler replaced regular driver Andrei Romanov with SEAT León Eurocup driver Tim Coronel. British Touring Car Championship regular Tom Boardman returned to the WTCC in a SUNRED Engineering run SEAT León TFSI. Volvo Olsbergs Green Racing joined the grid for the first of two events with their Scandinavian Touring Car Cup driver Robert Dahlgren.

Report

Free practice
Robert Huff topped the opening practice session of his home event on Saturday morning, the Chevrolet driver beating the BMW pairing of Andy Priaulx and Augusto Farfus. Gabriele Tarquini was the fastest SEAT driver in fourth. Colin Turkington was seventh in his eBay Motors run BMW, Boardman was thirteenth in his SUNRED SEAT and Harry Vaulkhard was the slowest of the local drivers, 22nd in his bamboo-engineering Chevrolet Lacetti. The session was interrupted when Michel Nykjær beached his car in the gravel trap at Paddock Hill bend.

Turkington led the final practice session, running three–tenths quicker than Alain Menu's Chevrolet. Wiechers-Sport driver Mehdi Bennani was black flagged for repeatedly exceeding the track limits.

Qualifying
With guest driver Dahlgren running inside the top ten during the practice sessions and Q1 in his nationally-homologated Volvo C30, the stewards decided to allow the fastest 11 drivers through into Q2, rather than the usual ten. In the end, Dahlgren could only managed 12th in Q1, allowing 11th-placed Tom Coronel through to Q2. Muller was quickest in Q1, ahead of Chevrolet teammates Huff and Menu.

Muller took pole position in Q2, with Huff and Menu second and third once again. Independent racer Turkington was fourth quickest, ahead of Tarquini and Priaulx.

Warm-Up
Turkington was quickest in the Sunday morning warm–up session, with Priaulx and Farfus behind completing a BMW 1–2–3. Pole sitter Muller was seventh behind the independent BMW of Kristian Poulsen.

Race One
Muller lead his Chevrolet teammates Huff and Menu away from the start of the first race. Tarquini moved ahead of Turkington for fourth, while Priaulx, who had to start 16th after an engine change, moved up to 12th. On lap four, Turkington regained fourth from Tarquini at the Druids hairpin. At the same time, Priaulx and teammate Farfus moved up to ninth and tenth past Fredy Barth, before passing eighth placed Norbert Michelisz. Farfus passed Tiago Monteiro for seventh, but Priaulx could not find a way through. Nearer the front, Menu was defending hard from Turkington, allowing Muller and Huff to escape ahead. Bueno pulled off in the fourth Chevrolet with an engine fire, bringing out the safety car. After the restart, Priaulx made a robust move on Monteiro for eighth and pole position for Race Two. On the penultimate lap Turkington got past Menu, who then dropped back on the final lap to seventh to get himself a front row start for Race Two.

Muller took the chequered flag ahead of Huff and Turkington. Tarquni and Tom Coronel finished fourth and fifth, ahead of Farfus, Menu and Priaulx.

Race Two
Farfus made a good start to Race Two from third on the grid to take the lead ahead of Priaulx and Menu. Further down, Barth and Poulsen made contact off the grid, putting Poulsen into the wall on the outside and giving Barth a slow puncture. At the end of the first lap, Boardman made contact with Monteiro, putting Monteiro out of the race. On lap three, Priaulx passed Farfus for the lead at Druids, with Menu attempting to follow him past the Brazilian. However, they made contact, putting Farfus into a spin and damaging Menu's steering. Turkington took advantage to move up to second behind Priaulx, with Tarquini, Coronel, Huff and Muller following.

Later on, Bennani hit Franz Engstler into a spin as the pair were fighting over tenth place. Muller passed Chevrolet teammate Huff for fifth. Farfus passed Boardman for ninth, before Boardman ran wide and retired from the race. Meanwhile, Bennani pushed Darryl O'Young into the gravel at Druids, bringing out the safety car. Farfus took eighth from Nykjær in the closing laps.

Priaulx crossed the line to take the victory ahead of Turkington and Tarquini. Coronel finished fourth ahead of Muller, Huff, Michelisz and Farfus.

Results

Qualifying

 — Poulsen was originally classified fifteenth in Q1 but had all his times deleted for breaching parc ferme regulations.

Race 1

Bold denotes Fastest lap.

Race 2

Bold denotes Fastest lap.

Standings after the event

Drivers' Championship standings

Yokohama Independents' Trophy standings

Manufacturers' Championship standings

 Note: Only the top five positions are included for both sets of drivers' standings.

References

Results Booklet PDF at MST Systems

External links
World Touring Car Championship official website

UK
Race of UK